190th may refer to:

190th Air Refueling Wing (aka Kansas Coyotes), an aerial refueling unit located at Forbes Field, Kansas
190th Battalion (Winnipeg Rifles), CEF, a unit in the Canadian Expeditionary Force during the First World War
190th Fighter Squadron, a unit of the Idaho Air National Guard
190th Street (IND Eighth Avenue Line), a station on the IND Eighth Avenue Line of the New York City Subway
Fordham Road – 190th Street (IRT Third Avenue Line), an express station on the demolished IRT Third Avenue Line

See also
190 (number)
190, the year 190 (CXC) of the Julian calendar
190 BC